Uwe Hünemeier (born 9 January 1986) is a German professional footballer who plays as a centre back for SC Paderborn 07.

Club career 
Born in Gütersloh, North Rhine-Westphalia, Hünemeier began with the football team at DJK Bokel. Because of its benefits other clubs wanted to sign him and Hünemeier joined the youth of FC Gütersloh 2000. He also appeared in relation to his performance positively in appearance and in 2000, he joined the youth of Borussia Dortmund. In 2004, he came to the second team of the club. A year later, he was awarded a professional contract and now belonged to the first team.

He made his debut for the senior Borussia Dortmund squad on 17 December 2005, when he started in a Bundesliga game against Bayern Munich and played the whole 90 minutes.

Hünemeier signed for Brighton & Hove Albion in August 2015. He scored his first goal for Brighton in a 3–1 win over Birmingham City on 4 April 2017. Brighton finished the season as runners up, and gained automatic promotion to the Premier League.

With Brighton promoted to the Premier League for the 2017–18 season, Hünemeier assumed the role of back-up centre defender with Lewis Dunk and Shane Duffy forming Brighton's established centre-back partnership. He made his Premier League debut as a substitute against Everton in a 1–1 draw on 15 October 2017, coming on for the injured Duffy.

In May 2018, Paderborn announced Hünemeier would return to the club for the new season, having signed a contract until summer 2020.

International career 
Hünemeier made three appearances for the German U17s.

Career statistics

Honours
Borussia Dortmund ll
Regionalliga West: 2008–09 Regionalliga

SC Paderborn
2.Bundesliga runner-up: 2013–14

Brighton & Hove Albion
EFL Championship runner-up: 2016–17

References

External links 
 
 

1986 births
Living people
People from Rietberg
Sportspeople from Detmold (region)
German footballers
German expatriate footballers
Germany youth international footballers
Association football defenders
Borussia Dortmund players
Borussia Dortmund II players
FC Energie Cottbus players
SC Paderborn 07 players
Brighton & Hove Albion F.C. players
Bundesliga players
2. Bundesliga players
3. Liga players
Regionalliga players
English Football League players
Expatriate footballers in England
German expatriate sportspeople in England
Footballers from North Rhine-Westphalia